Jonathan David Leicester (born February 7, 1979) is a former professional baseball pitcher. He previously played for the Chicago Cubs and Baltimore Orioles of Major League Baseball.

Career 

Prior to the  season, Leicester was traded to the Texas Rangers in exchange for left-handed minor league pitcher Clint Brannon. Leicester never appeared in a game for the Rangers in the majors, and after the 2006 season, became a free agent.

In , he began playing for the Baltimore Orioles organization. He spent most of the season with the Triple-A Norfolk Tides, but pitched his first major league complete game in a September callup. He began the  season in Norfolk. After the 2008 season, he signed with the Orix Buffaloes in Nippon Professional Baseball, playing for the club in 2009 and 2010. On March 1, 2011, San Diego signed him and he spent the year at AAA Tucson starting 25 games. He elected free agency after the season. Leicester played two seasons for the Uni-President 7-Eleven Lions of the Chinese Professional Baseball League in 2012 and 2013.

On March 29, 2014, Leicester signed with the Diablos Rojos del Mexico of the Mexican League. On June 3, 2014, Leicester was released. On February 6, 2015, Leicester signed with the Leones de Yucatán. He was released on June 22, 2015, and signed with the Pericos de Puebla the next day. Leicester was released by Puebla on July 2.

Leicester signed with the Southern Maryland Blue Crabs of the Atlantic League of Professional Baseball shortly after his release from the Pericos. He re-signed with the Blue Crabs for the 2016 season and became a free agent after the year.

References

External links
, or Retrosheet, or Pura Pelota (VPBL)

1979 births
Living people
Aberdeen IronBirds players
Águilas Cibaeñas players
American expatriate baseball players in the Dominican Republic
American expatriate baseball players in Japan
American expatriate baseball players in Mexico
American expatriate baseball players in Taiwan
Baltimore Orioles players
Baseball players from California
Chicago Cubs players
Daytona Cubs players
Diablos Rojos del México players
Eugene Emeralds players
Gulf Coast Orioles players
Iowa Cubs players
Lansing Lugnuts players
Leones de Yucatán players
Leones del Caracas players
American expatriate baseball players in Venezuela
Major League Baseball pitchers
Memphis Tigers baseball players
Mexican League baseball pitchers
Nippon Professional Baseball pitchers
Norfolk Tides players
Oklahoma RedHawks players
Orix Buffaloes players
People from Mariposa, California
Pericos de Puebla players
Southern Maryland Blue Crabs players
Tucson Padres players
Uni-President 7-Eleven Lions players
University of Memphis alumni
West Tennessee Diamond Jaxx players